Gleb Yuryevich Shulpyakov (born 28 January 1971) is a Russian poet, essayist, novelist and translator. He lives in Moscow.

Biography
Shulpyakov graduated from Moscow State University with a degree in journalism.

In 2001, he was awarded the Triumph Prize for his first full-length book of poems, The Flick.  His second book of poems, Acorn, was published in 2007. His first book of poetry to appear in English was A Fireproof Box, translated by Christopher Mattison and published by Canarium Books in 2011.

In addition to his books of poems, Shulpyakov is the author of several novels (The Sinan Book, Tsunami, Fez), books of travel essays (Persona Grappa, Uncle’s Dream), a play (Pushkin in America), and numerous essays and literary criticism for Russian periodicals (Nezavisimaya Gazeta, Novaya Younost). He has translated various British and American works into Russian, including poetry by Ted Hughes, Robert Hass, and W. H. Auden.

Works
 (translator) W.H. Auden: Selected essays and poems (1998)
 The Flick (poems) (2001)
 Persona Grappa (travel essays) (2002)
 Pushkin in America (play) (2005)
 Uncle's Dream (travel essays) (2005)
 The Sinan Book (novel) (2005)
 Acorn (poems) (2007)
 Tsunami (novel) (2008)
 Fez (novel) (2010)
 Letters to Yakub (poems) (2012)
 Museum of Dante (novel) (2013)
 The Poet and the Philosopher: a Dialogue (with Leon Tsvasman) (2015)

References

 Alexander Deriev (Editor), Ars Interpres: Two Skies Forfattares Bokmaskin (2005) . Contributor's note page 324.

External links
 Biographical note on publisher's site
 Gleb Shulpyakov's website

Russian male poets
1971 births
Living people

International Writing Program alumni